Narhari Prasad Sai (born 1929) was a member of the 6th Lok Sabha, the lower house of the Indian Parliament. He is from Bandarchuan village near Kunkuri in the Jashpur State, India.

He was elected from Raigarh in Madhya Pradesh. He had defeated the Congress candidate in the post-emergency elections to the Parliament and was made a Minister of State for Communication in the Morarji Desai led Janata party government. He lost the next election to Pushpa Devi Singh of the Congress Party (INC-I) in 1980 and gradually faded out of the political scene.

References

India MPs 1977–1979
Lok Sabha members from Chhattisgarh
Janata Party politicians
1929 births
Possibly living people
Madhya Pradesh MLAs 1962–1967
Madhya Pradesh MLAs 1972–1977